C30 may refer to:

Vehicles 
Aircraft
 Caspar C 30, a German reconnaissance aircraft
 Cierva C.30, a Spanish autogyro
 Curtiss C-30 Condor, an American military transport aircraft
 Siren C.30 Edelweiss, a French sailplane

Automobiles
 Great Wall Voleex C30, a Chinese subcompact
 Nissan Laurel C30, a Japanese sedan
 Sauber C30, a Swiss Formula One car
 Volvo C30, a Swedish hatchback

Rail transport
 New South Wales C30 class locomotive, an Australian steam locomotive
 SL C30, a subway train of the Stockholm metro

Ships
 , a Thomaston-class landing ship of the Brazilian Navy
 , a C-class submarine of the Royal Navy
 , a Fiji-class light cruiser of the Royal Navy

Other uses 
 C30 road (Namibia)
 AMD C-30, a mobile processor
 Caldwell 30, a spiral galaxy
 King's Gambit, a chess opening
 Protecting Children from Internet Predators Act, an Act of the Parliament of Canada introduced as Bill C-30
 C30, a compact audio cassette
 C30 endopeptidase, also called 3C-like protease